The 1993–94 Meistriliiga was the third season of the Meistriliiga, Estonia's premier football league. Flora  won their first title after beating Norma in the title play-off as regular season had ended in a draw.

League table

Title play-off

Results

Top scorers

See also
1993 in Estonian football
1994 in Estonian football
1993–94 Esiliiga

References

Estonia - List of final tables (RSSSF)

Meistriliiga seasons
1994 in Estonian football
1993 in Estonian football
Estonia